The Lost Chord is a 1933 British drama film directed by Maurice Elvey and starring John Stuart, Elizabeth Allan and Jack Hawkins. The screenplay concerns a musician who becomes embroiled in the domestic rows of an aristocratic family. It was inspired by the Arthur Sullivan song The Lost Chord. Two earlier films directed by Wilfred Noy, The Lost Chord (1917) and The Lost Chord (1925), were both also based on the song. The film was made at Twickenham Studios.

Cast
 John Stuart as David Graham
 Elizabeth Allan as Joan Elton
 Mary Glynne as Countess Madeleine
 Anne Grey as Pauline
 Leslie Perrins as Count Carol Zara
 Jack Hawkins as Dr. Jim Selby
 Garry Marsh as Joseph Mendel
 Betty Astell as Madge
 Frederick Ranalow as Beppo
 Barbara Everest as Mother Superior
 Bernard Ansell as Benito Levina
 Eliot Makeham as Bertie Pollard
 Tudor Davies as The Singer
 Billy Mayerl as At The Piano

References

Bibliography
 Low, Rachael. Filmmaking in 1930s Britain. George Allen & Unwin, 1985.
 Wood, Linda. British Films, 1927-1939. British Film Institute, 1986.

External links

1933 films
1933 drama films
1930s English-language films
Films directed by Maurice Elvey
Films shot at Twickenham Film Studios
British drama films
British black-and-white films
1930s British films